Cousin Silas is the stage name of English electronic music artist David Hughes. The name comes from a character in King Crimson's song, "Happy Family". He has released over eighty albums on various netlabels. Between 1990 and 2000 he wrote several short stories, poetry, prose, and articles that were published in small press magazines such as Back Brain Recluse, Nova SF, The Scanner, REM, Nerve Gardens, The Lyre, Auguries and Focus. On 28 January 2004 Cousin Silas made an appearance on BBC Radio 1 played by John Peel.

Biography 

David Hughes, born 7 May 1959, is an English musician and electronic music producer most notable for his ambient and drone music. David was born in Huddersfield, and spent most of that time in the Colne Valley. He attended Crow Lane, Royds Hall School, Colne Valley High School and Kirklees College, formerly known as Huddersfield Technical College. He then apprenticed as an electrical engineer and moved on to become a telecommunications engineer. Before experimenting with soundscapes in 2000, David played guitar in a couple of local bands doing new wave and punk covers. His current style of music is influenced by JG Ballard, Brian Eno, and Forteana. The musician is a self-proclaimed "sound alchemist" and has referred to his music as "audio photographs" or "moodscapes." He is a fan of science fiction novels written between 1950 and 1980 by authors such as Clark Ashton Smith, HP Lovecraft, M.R. James, Brian Aldiss, and Michael Moorcock.

Discography 

Compilations
 Unholy Trinity (2002, Fflint Central Records)
 :: FALLING :: (2006, Earth Monkey Productions)
 The Resting Bench Remix Project – Volume 1 (Collab, 2006, Earth Monkey Productions)
 EMP075 | Various Artists | Field Notes (2009, Earth Monkey Productions)
 Dark Minds compilation (2010, Kopp Netlabel) 
 Ambient Consequences (2010, Kopp Netlabel)
 The BFW Christmas Album 2010 (2010, BFW Recordings)
 BFW Album in a Day volume 2 (2011, BFW Recordings)
 Chain Reaction (2011, Kopp Netlabel)
 BFW Album in a Day volume 3 (2011, BFW Recordings)
 The BFW Christmas Album 2011 (2011, BFW Recordings)
 Elements 1 (2012, The Future Elements)
 Space Rock: The Compilation (2012, Sound For Good Records)
 BFW Album In A Day volume 4 (2012, BFW Recordings)
 all|is|calm 2012 (2012, Free Floating Music)
 Remix Eye Movement (Collab, 2012 Acustronica)
 BFW Album in a Day volume 5 (2012, BFW Recordings)
 Doomsday and Brimstone (2012, Sound For Good Records)
 Other People's Remixes (Collab, 2012, Peter Fitzpatrick)
...ending the year on a high 2012 (2012, We Are All Ghosts)
 The BFW Christmas Album 2012 (2012, BFW Recordings)
 No Labels No Musics 4 (Collab, 2013, Editora Do Porto)
 I Heard Something in the Distance volume 10 (2013, BFW Recordings)
 ANDREAS N°16 – Parallel Worlds (2013, Fraction Studio)
 ROBOTS! (2013, Aural Films)
 Some Great Universes in One Place (2013, Sillage Intemporel)
 The Human Condition – Dedications to Phillp K. Dick (2013, Sounds For Good Records)
 BFW Album in a Day volume 7 (2013, BFW Recordings)
 Desktopography album 4 "rainy day"
 Fukushima Drones (2013, Aural Films)
 Midnight Radio Compilation 1, 2, 3, 4, 5, 6, 7, 8 (2013, Midnight Radio)
 Persuasive Experimentations Vol. 1 (2013, Roach Clip Records)
 glasklinge sampler 4 (2013, Midnight Radio)
 VA Compilation #2 (2013, Assembly Field)
 X-mas 2013 (2013, Petroglyph Music)
 Touched (2013, Released on Bandcamp with proceeds going to Macmillan Cancer Support)
 Radio Happy Music Compilation for the Haiyan/Yolanda Victims (2013, Radio Happy)
 The BFW Christmas Album 2013 (2013, BFW Recordings)
 ...ending the year on a high 2013 (2014, We Are All Ghosts)
 Midnight Radio Compilation 10, 11 (2014, Midnight Radio)
 I No Longer Love Blue Skies (2014, Sounds For Good Records)
 ALL FM Mostly Ambient Radio Sessions volume one
 VA. A Dizzy Taste (2015, DigitalDIZZY)
 Midnight Radio Compilation 54 (2015, Midnight Radio)

References

External links 
 Official Website
Cousin Silas on Facebook
 Cousin Silas on Soundcloud
 Cousin Silas on Discogs

1959 births
Living people
Musicians from Yorkshire
Male guitarists